In Buddhism, an anāgāmin (Sanskrit; Pāli: anāgāmī, lit. "non-returning") is a partially enlightened person who has cut off the first five fetters that bind the ordinary mind. Anāgāmins are the third of the four aspirants.

The anāgāmin is not reborn into the human world after death, but into the heaven of the Pure Abodes, where only anāgāmins reside. There they attain full enlightenment (arahantship).

Requisites for becoming an anāgāmin
An anāgāmin is free from the lowest five chains or fetters (Pali: pañcorambhāgiyāni-saṃyojanāni; 五下分結) which are as follows:
 Belief in ātman or self (Sanskrit:  or svakāya-dṛṣṭi; Pāli: sakkāya-diṭṭhi; 有身見)
 Attachment to rites and rituals (Sanskrit: śīlavrata-parāmarśa-dṛṣṭi; Pāli: sīlabbata-parāmāsa-diṭṭhi; 戒禁取見)
 Skeptical doubt (Sanskrit: vicikitsā; Pali: vicikicchā; 疑)
 Sensuous craving (kāmarāga; 欲貪)
 Ill will or aversion (vyāpāda or byāpāda; 瞋恚)

The remaining five higher fetters (Sanskrit: pañca-ūrdhvabhāgiya-saṃyojana; Pali: pañcuddhambhāgiyāni-saṃyojanāni; 五上分結) from which an anāgāmin is not yet free are:
 Craving for fine-material existence (the first 4 jhanas) (rūparāga; 色貪)
 Craving for immaterial existence (the last 4 jhanas) (arūparāga; 無色貪)
 Conceit or pride (māna; 慢)
 Restlessness (Sanskrit: auddhatya; Pali: uddhacca; 掉挙)
 Ignorance (Sanskrit: avidyā; Pali: avijjā; 無明)

Kāmarāga and vyāpāda, which they are free from, can also be interpreted as craving for becoming and non-becoming, respectively.

Anāgāmins are at an intermediate stage between the sakṛdāgāmin and the arhat. An arhat enjoys complete freedom from the ten fetters, while an anāgāmin's mind remains very pure.

Five types of anāgāmin
The Pali Puggalapannatti and the Sanskrit texts Mahāprajñāpāramitāśāstra and the Sarvāstivādin-Vaibhaṣika Abhidharma both describe five classes of anāgāmin. When an anāgāmin is reborn in the Pure Abodes, one of the five following scenarios will occur:
 He will attain arhatship immediately after rebirth or within the first half of his life in the Pure Abodes. Such a being is called "one who reaches Nibbāna within the first half of the life" (Sanskrit: antarāparinirvāyin; Pali: antarā-parinibbāyī).
 He will attain arhatship within the latter half of his life in the Pure Abodes or at the moment of death. Such a being is called "one who reaches Nibbāna after crossing half the life-time" (Sanskrit: upapadyaparinirvāyin; Pali: upahacca-parinibbāyī).
 He exerts himself to the point of attaining arhatship. Such a being is called "one who reaches Nibbāna with exertion" (Sanskrit: sābhisaṃskāraparinirvāyin; Pali: sasankhāra-parinibbāyī).
 He does not exert himself, yet attains arhatship. Such a being is called "one who reaches Nibbāna without exertion" (Sanskrit: anabhisaṃskāraparinirvāyin; Pali: asankhāra-parinibbāyī).
 He traverses the five heavens of the Pure Abodes in order from lowest to highest before attaining arhatship. Such a being is called "one who passes up-stream to the highest gods" (Sanskrit: ūrdhvasrotas; Pali: uddhamsota-akanittha-gāmī)."

Anāgāmins in literature
Several figures who appear in the literature achieve the state of an anāgāmin. Some of these people include:
 The Brahmin Bāvarī
 The householder Uggata
 The wandering ascetic Subhadda
 The monk Pukkusāti
 The nun Nandā
 The laywoman Matikamata
 The layman Citta

 The layman Visākha
 The householder Sandhāna
 The Brahman Uṇṇābha
 Ghatikara the Potter, a lay follower of the Kāśyapa Buddha

See also 
 Four stages of enlightenment
 Fetter (Buddhism)

References

Sources
 Thomas Rhys Davids & William Stede (eds.) (1921-5). The Pali Text Society’s Pali–English Dictionary. Chipstead: Pali Text Society. A general on-line search engine for the PED is available at http://dsal.uchicago.edu/dictionaries/pali/. 

Buddhist titles
Buddhist stages of enlightenment